Sant'Omobono Terme (previously Sant'Omobono Imagna;) is a comune (municipality) in the Province of Bergamo in the Italian region of Lombardy, located about  northeast of Milan and about  northwest of Bergamo.

Sant' Omobono Imagna borders the following municipalities: Bedulita, Berbenno, Brembilla, Corna Imagna, Costa Valle Imagna, Roncola, Rota d'Imagna. The former commune of Valsecca was merged with Sant'Omobono in 2014.

Origins of the name 

The toponym originates from the patron saint of the fraction of Mazzoleni, which composes the commune together with Cepino, Selino Alto, Selino Basso, and Valsecca.

The commune of Sant'Omobono Imagna was constituted in 1927 with the aggregation of the communes of Mazzoleni and Falghera, Cepino and Selino. Thanks to a regional law of August 2004, the name was changed from Sant'Omobono Imagna to Sant'Omobono Terme.

Image Gallery

References